Errol Hutchesson (born 7 September 1939) is a former Australian rules footballer who played with Collingwood in the Victorian Football League (VFL).

Hutchesson came to Collingwood from Jeparit and played the first three games of the 1958 season before breaking his leg. Collingwood went on to win the premiership with Hutchesson on the sidelines but he appeared on the wing in their losing 1960 and 1966 Grand Final teams. He gathered nine Brownlow Medal votes in 1966, which was the most by a Collingwood player that year.

After leaving the VFL, Hutchesson spent some time at Prahran where he played in a premiership.

References

Holmesby, Russell and Main, Jim (2007). The Encyclopedia of AFL Footballers. 7th ed. Melbourne: Bas Publishing.

1939 births
Australian rules footballers from Victoria (Australia)
Collingwood Football Club players
Prahran Football Club players
Living people